TVP3 Bydgoszcz is one of the regional branches of the TVP, Poland's public television broadcaster. It serves the entire Kuyavian-Pomeranian Voivodeship.

External links 
Official website

Television channels and stations established in 1994
Bydgoszcz
Telewizja Polska